Derek Mann (1944–2007) was a football coach, player and manager.

Career
As a player, Mann was an apprentice with Shrewsbury Town. However, injury prevented him from progressing to first-team. He later joined the backroom staff at Shrewsbury, as well as Watford, Wolverhampton Wanderers and Huddersfield Town. He also had a spell in charge of Telford United.

Mann managed Chester City Football Club from January 1995 to April 1995. His appointment was something of a surprise as he had only joined the club as physio four months before. After a poor start to the season under predecessor Mike Pejic, Chester were deep in the relegation zone at the time of Mann's arrival, and during his reign they managed only one league win.

References

Chester City F.C. managers
1944 births
2007 deaths
Telford United F.C. managers
English football managers
Shrewsbury Town F.C. players
Shrewsbury Town F.C. non-playing staff
Watford F.C. non-playing staff
English footballers
Association football physiotherapists
Association footballers not categorized by position